Yousif Abd-El-Rahman Ali Abd-El-Rahman Al-Bairaq (or translate as Yousef Abdulrahman) (born 4 March 1989) is an Emirati goalkeeper He currently plays for Fujairah SC club And UAE National U20.

He played once at 2010 AFC Champions League, the last group stage match.

International career
In November 2009, he was call-up to the national team against Manchester City, Czech Republic and Iraq. He played the match against Iraq.

Career statistics

Club

1Continental competitions include the AFC Champions League
2Other tournaments include the UAE President Cup and Etisalat Emirates Cup

National team

As of 27 September 2009

1Continental competitions include the AFC U-19 Championship
2Other tournaments include the FIFA U-20 World Cup

References

External links
 
 
 
 

1989 births
Living people
Emirati footballers
Al-Ittihad Kalba SC players
Al Ain FC players
Al-Shaab CSC players
Al Dhafra FC players
UAE First Division League players
UAE Pro League players
Association football goalkeepers